The 1933 European Wrestling Championships were held in  the men's Freestyle style  in Paris 26–30 November 1933; the Greco-Romane style and  in Helsinki 17–21 March 1933.

Medal table

Medal summary

Men's freestyle

Men's Greco-Roman

References

External links
FILA Database

W
W
European Wrestling Championships
Euro
Euro
Sports competitions in Paris
Sports competitions in Helsinki
1933 in European sport